Erik Jensen is an American actor, playwright, screenwriter, and director.

Early life
Jensen was born and raised in Detroit Lakes, Minnesota. He graduated from Apple Valley High School in Minnesota in 1988. He earned a Bachelor of Fine Arts in acting from Carnegie Mellon University.

Career
An actor, writer, and director, Erik Jensen regularly appears on the ABC Network Television series For Life as ADA Dez O'Reilly. Notably, he appeared as Thurman Munson of the New York Yankees in the ESPN miniseriesThe Bronx Is Burning, and as conspiracy talk show host Frank Cody in Mr. Robot, as well as Dr. Stephen Edwards on The Walking Dead. Jensen appeared alongside Aasif Mandvi in the Pulitzer Prize-winning production of Ayad Akhtars' Disgraced at Lincoln Center. He also appeared as legendary rock critic Lester Bangs in the one-man play How to Be a Rock Critic (based on the writings of Lester Bangs) which he co-wrote with his wife Jessica Blank. How to Be A Rock Critic received a completion commission from Center Theatre Group and was produced at the Kirk Douglas Theater, ArtsEmerson, and Steppenwolf Theatre Company before being produced Off-Broadway at The Public Theater. How to Be A Rock Critic received critical acclaim from Rolling Stone, The New Yorker, Billboard and other publications.

In 2017 he co-directed the film Almost Home with Jessica Blank based on her novel of the same name.

In 2020, Jensen and Blank's co-written plays, Coal Country and The Line, both premiered at The Public Theater.

Writing 
Jensen and his wife Jessica Blank have been noted for their documentary theater innovations, citing the works of Anna Deavere Smith, Emily Mann, and Studs Terkel as influences.

The Exonerated 
Blank and Jensen co-wrote The Exonerated, a play based on interviews they conducted with more than 40 exonerated death row inmates. In spring 2002, they co-directed The Exonerated at The Actors' Gang Theater. That production was nominated for five Ovation Awards and three NAACP Awards, won the Ovation for Best World Premiere Play, and has toured universities nationally. The New York production of The Exonerated ran for more than 600 performances off-Broadway, toured nationally, and won the Outer Critics Circle, Lortel, and Drama Desk awards, as well as awards from Amnesty International, American Bar Association, National Council of Criminal Defense Lawyers and more. It was adapted as a movie for Court TV starring Brian Dennehy, Danny Glover, Delroy Lindo, Aidan Quinn, and Susan Sarandon. The play has been produced internationally in Dublin, Edinburgh, and London, in the United Kingdom; and in Japan, Mexico, France, China, Thailand, Iran, and Italy. It has been translated into French, Spanish, Italian, Mandarin, and Japanese.

Aftermath 
Blank and Jensen co-wrote the documentary play Aftermath based on interviews they conducted in 2008 with Iraqi civilian refugees in Jordan. Blank directed Aftermath Off-Broadway at New York Theatre Workshop; it was nominated for two Drama League awards and toured internationally for two years.

Almost Home 
Jensen and Blank co-wrote and co-directed the feature film Almost Home in 2016, adapted from the novel Almost Home written by Jessica Blank, published in October 2007 by Hyperion.

How to Be A Rock Critic 
Their play, How To Be A Rock Critic (based on the writings of Lester Bangs), received a commission from Center Theatre Group and was produced at the Kirk Douglas Theater, South Coast Repertory, ArtsEmerson, Steppenwolf Theatre Company, and Off-Broadway at The Public Theater, with Jensen starring and Blank directing.

Coal Country 
Jensen and Blank's documentary play, Coal Country, about the 2010 Upper Big Branch Mine disaster, opened at The Public Theater on March 3, 2020, directed by Jessica Blank, with original music written and performed by Grammy Award-winning musician Steve Earle. Coal Country was suspended when theaters closed down March 11, 2020 due to the COVID-19 pandemic. The play is a recipient of the Edgerton Foundation New Play Award, and was nominated for the Drama Desk award for Outstanding Director (Jessica Blank) and Outstanding Music in a Play (Steve Earle).

The Line 
Blank and Jensen wrote The Line in 2020, which tells the story about New York City health-care workers fighting against COVID-19. The one-hour documentary-style production was directed by Blank, produced and presented by The Public Theater, and streamed on YouTube from July 8 through September 1, 2020.

Living Justice 
Blank and Jensen's book Living Justice (2005), a memoir about the making of The Exonerated, was published by Simon and Schuster and received a Kirkus Starred Review.

The Reconcilers 
Erik’s sci-fi graphic novel The Reconcilers was published in 2010 by Viking Warrior Press.

Personal life
Jensen married writer, director and actress Jessica Blank in 2001. They are based in Brooklyn, New York.

Filmography

Film

Television

Stage

References

External links
In 'Coal Country,' Memories From a Mining Tragedy Live On - NY TIMES
The Art of Documentary Theater: How Jessica Blank and Erik Jensen Make Art Out of Real Events - SLATE
A Preventable Tragedy, and a Model of Loving Care: The Lessons of ‘Coal Country' - AMERICAN THEATRE 

Billboard Magazine article on Jensen as Lester Bangs in "How to Be A Rock Critic"
"How to Be A Rock Critic" review, The New Yorker
"How to Be A Rock Critic" review, Rolling Stone
Greil Marcus' "How To Be A Rock Critic" Review: Real Life Rock Top Ten, Village Voice
"How to Be A Rock Critic" review quotes- Boston, Arts Emerson
 "How to Be A Rock Critic" review Boston, Cape Cod Times
Rolling Stone article on Jensen and Blanks Lester Bangs play "How to Be A Rock Critic"
 "How to Be A Rock Critic"  Boston Globe Article on Jensen/Blank team, Arts Emerson
 "How to Be A Rock Critic" Boston Globe review, Arts Emerson
 "How to Be A Rock Critic" review Boston "Ryans Smashing Life", Arts Emerson
"How to Be A Rock Critic" review LA WEEKLY
"How to Be a Rock Critic" review LA TIMES
Blank and Jensen's "Aftermath" review BOSTON GLOBE
"Aftermath" review NY TIMES
"The Exonerated" review NY TIMES
NY Times Review of "Disgraced" at Lincoln Center
"The Reconcilers" Graphic novel official website
Interview with Jensen regarding his graphic novel projects
"Coal Country" review NY TIMES
"Coal Country" review HOLLYWOOD REPORTER
"Coal Country" review THE DAILY BEAST
"Coal Country" review THEATER NEWS ONLINE
"The Line" review NY TIMES 
"The Line" review LA TIMES 
"The Line" review THE NEW YORKER 
"The Line" review WASHINGTON POST 
"The Line" review NEWSWEEK

21st-century American dramatists and playwrights
American male film actors
American male television actors
American male stage actors
Living people
Year of birth missing (living people)
People from Apple Valley, Minnesota
Carnegie Mellon University College of Fine Arts alumni
Male actors from Minnesota
Writers from Minnesota
21st-century American male actors
20th-century American male actors
Apple Valley High School (Minnesota) alumni